Càng Long is a rural district (huyện) of Trà Vinh province in the Mekong Delta region of Vietnam.  the district had a population of 287.955 . The district covers an area of 284 km². The district capital lies at Càng Long. In Sino-Vietnamese script, used until 1945, the city's name is given as 冈隆.

Geography 
Càng Long district is located in the northern province of Trà Vinh. On the east side it borders the provincial capital city of Trà Vinh, Bến Tre province and boundary in the northeast and Châu Thành district in the southeast. To the north is Vũng Liêm district, Vĩnh Long.

Located in Bình Phú and Đại Phước Communes, two of Càng Long's 13 Communes is the National Highway Route 60 ( Quốc Lộ 60 - QL.60 ), the road that connects Trà Vinh and other provinces and cities such as Bến Tre and Hồ Chí Minh City, after the completion of Cổ Chiên Bridge on 16 May 2015, this National Highway Route 60 became the fastest and the most convenient way to Ho Chi Minh City, thanks to the highway and the new bridge, the travel distance between Tra Vinh and Ho Chi Minh City ( Saigon ) has been reduced by 70km.

The centre of the district, Càng Long Town, is located along the National Highway Route 53 ( Quốc Lộ 53 - QL.53 ), Trà Vinh City and Vĩnh Long City are 21 km and 43 km away respectively.

Càng Long district with QL.53 and QL.60 is the main economic, cultural and social gateway of Tra Vinh Province to other provinces, especially provinces in the Mekong River Delta region.

Climate

References

Districts of Trà Vinh province